"See the Star" is the first UK single and second US radio single from Delirious?'s second album, Mezzamorphis. It reached #16 in the UK Singles Charts making it the band's highest charting single, until their final single release History Maker which entered the UK Singles chart at #4 in 2010.

Track listing
CD1
"See the Star"
"Follow"
"See the Star" (d:llatrix Dub)

CD2
"See the Star"
"Obsession" (Odsession Mix)
"See the Star" CD-ROM Video

Chart performance

1999 singles
Delirious? songs
1999 songs
Songs written by Stu G
Songs written by Martin Smith (English musician)